Žana Marić (née Čović; born 20 August 1989) is a Croatian handball player for Mosonmagyaróvári KC SE and the Croatian national team.

References

1989 births
Living people
Croatian female handball players
People from Trogir
Expatriate handball players in Poland
Croatian expatriate sportspeople in Germany
Croatian expatriate sportspeople in Poland
Mediterranean Games bronze medalists for Croatia
Competitors at the 2013 Mediterranean Games
Mediterranean Games medalists in handball
RK Podravka Koprivnica players
21st-century Croatian women
20th-century Croatian women